The 2011–12 Spanish football season was the first for CE Sabadell in the second level since 1993, when the team was relegated for not paying its players. After a stunning season in Segunda División B, the team promoted via play-off and was runner-up in the overall season, being surpassed only by Real Murcia (also promoted), who won on penalties in the play-off final matches (agg. 1–1 a.e.t, 8–9 p.s.o). During early June, Joan Soteras confirmed that the team manager, Lluís Carreras renewed for this season after the rumors emerged in April that linked him with FC Barcelona B.

Sabadell finished the season in 19th place, which would normally have resulted in an immediate return to Segunda B. However, they were reprieved from relegation when Villarreal were relegated from La Liga at the end of the season. Villarreal's relegation from La Liga meant that their reserve side, Villarreal B, would automatically drop to Segunda B.

Trophies balance

Competitive Balance

Summer transfers

In

Out

Loan in

Loan return

Loan end

Winter transfers

In

Out

Loan in

Current squad

Squad
Updated to 31 January 2012

Youth system

Called up by their national football team

Match stats

Match results

Pre-season and friendly tournaments

Friendly matches

2011–12 Copa Catalunya

Liga Adelante

 Win   Draw   Lost

 Liga Adelante Winners (also promoted)
 Direct promotion to Liga BBVA (Liga Adelante Runners-up)
 Liga BBVA promotion play-offs
 Relegation to Segunda División B (From 13 May: The 19th qualified won't be relegated as Villarreal CF were relegated from Liga BBVA and Villarreal B were also relegated to Segunda División B, consequently)

Copa del Rey

Second Qualifying Round

References

CE Sabadell FC seasons
Sabadell
Sabadell